Henry Mancini (born Enrico Nicola Mancini, ; April 16, 1924 – June 14, 1994) was an American composer, conductor, arranger, pianist and flautist. Often cited as one of the greatest composers in the history of film, he won four Academy Awards, a Golden Globe, and twenty Grammy Awards, plus a posthumous Grammy Lifetime Achievement Award in 1995.

His works include the theme and soundtrack for the Peter Gunn television series as well as the music for The Pink Panther film series ("The Pink Panther Theme") and "Moon River" from Breakfast at Tiffany's. The Music from Peter Gunn won the inaugural Grammy Award for Album of the Year. Mancini enjoyed a long collaboration in composing film scores for the film director Blake Edwards.  Mancini also scored a No. 1 hit single during the rock era on the Hot 100:  his arrangement and recording of the "Love Theme from Romeo and Juliet" spent two weeks at the top, starting with the week ending June 28, 1969.

Early life
Henry Mancini was born Enrico Nicola Mancini in Maple Heights, Ohio and raised in West Aliquippa, Pennsylvania, near Pittsburgh. Both his parents were Italian immigrants. Originally from Scanno, Abruzzo, his father Quintiliano "Quinto" Mancini was a laborer at the Jones and Laughlin Steel Company and amateur musician who first came to the U.S. as a teenager around 1910. His mother Anna came to the U.S. from Forlì del Sannio as an infant.

At age eight, Mancini began learning the piccolo. Mancini said that hearing Rudolph G. Kopp's score in the 1935 Cecil B. DeMille film The Crusades inspired him to pursue film music composition despite his father's wishes for him to become a teacher.

He later studied piano and orchestral arrangement under Pittsburgh concert pianist and Stanley Theatre (now Benedum Center) conductor Max Adkins. Not only did Mancini produce arrangements for the Stanley Theatre bands, but he also wrote one for Benny Goodman, an up-and-coming bandleader introduced to him by Adkins. According to Mancini biographer John Caps, the young Mancini "preferred music arranging to any kind of musical performance, but taking apart a Chopin mazurka or Schumann sonata in order to play it helped him see...how the puzzle of form, meter, melody, harmony, and counterpoint had been solved by previous composers."

After graduating from Aliquippa High School in 1942, Mancini first attended the Carnegie Institute of Technology (now Carnegie Mellon University) in Pittsburgh. Later that year, Mancini transferred to the Juilliard School of Music in New York City following a successful audition in which he performed a Beethoven sonata and improvisation on "Night and Day" by Cole Porter. Because he could only take orchestration and composition courses in his second year, Mancini studied only piano in his first year at Juilliard, in a condition Caps called "aimless and oppressed—a far cry from Adkins's enabling protective environment."

After turning 18, Mancini enlisted in the United States Army Air Forces in 1943. While in basic training in Atlantic City, New Jersey, he met musicians being recruited by Glenn Miller. Owing to a recommendation by Miller, Mancini was first assigned to the 28th Air Force Band before being reassigned overseas to the 1306th Engineers Brigade in France. In 1945, he helped liberate the Mauthausen-Gusen concentration camp in Austria.

Career
Newly discharged, Mancini entered the music industry. In 1946, he became a pianist and arranger for the newly re-formed Glenn Miller Orchestra, led by 'Everyman' Tex Beneke. After World War II, Mancini broadened his skills in composition, counterpoint, harmony and orchestration during studies opening with the composers Ernst Krenek and Mario Castelnuovo-Tedesco.

In 1952, Mancini joined the Universal-International's music department. During the next six years, he contributed music to over 100 movies, most notably Creature from the Black Lagoon, The Creature Walks Among Us, It Came from Outer Space, Tarantula, This Island Earth, The Glenn Miller Story (for which he received his first Academy Award nomination), The Benny Goodman Story and Orson Welles' Touch of Evil. During this time, he also wrote some popular songs. His first hit was a single by Guy Lombardo and His Royal Canadians titled I Won't Let You Out of My Heart.

Mancini left Universal-International to work as an independent composer/arranger in 1958. Soon afterward, he scored the television series Peter Gunn for writer/producer Blake Edwards. This was the genesis of a relationship in which Edwards and Mancini collaborated on 30 films over 35 years. Along with Alex North, Elmer Bernstein, Leith Stevens and Johnny Mandel, Henry Mancini was a pioneer of the inclusion of jazz elements in the late romantic orchestral film and TV scoring prevalent at the time. Mancini's scores for Blake Edwards included Breakfast at Tiffany's (with the standard "Moon River") and Days of Wine and Roses (with the title song, "Days of Wine and Roses"), as well as Experiment in Terror, The Pink Panther (and all of its sequels), The Great Race, The Party, 10 (including "It's Easy to Say") and Victor Victoria. Another director with whom Mancini had a longstanding partnership was Stanley Donen (Charade, Arabesque, Two for the Road). Mancini also composed for Howard Hawks (Man's Favorite Sport?, Hatari! – which included the "Baby Elephant Walk"), Martin Ritt (The Molly Maguires), Vittorio de Sica (Sunflower), Norman Jewison (Gaily, Gaily), Paul Newman (Sometimes a Great Notion, The Glass Menagerie), Stanley Kramer (Oklahoma Crude), George Roy Hill (The Great Waldo Pepper), Arthur Hiller (Silver Streak), Ted Kotcheff (Who Is Killing the Great Chefs of Europe?), and others. Mancini's score for the Alfred Hitchcock film Frenzy (1972) in Bachian organ andante, for organ and an orchestra of strings was rejected and replaced by Ron Goodwin's work.

Mancini scored many TV movies, including The Moneychangers, The Thorn Birds and The Shadow Box. He wrote many television themes, including Mr. Lucky (starring John Vivyan and Ross Martin), NBC Mystery Movie, Tic Tac Dough (1990 version), Once Is Not Enough, and What's Happening!!  In the 1984–85 television season, four series featured original Mancini themes:  Newhart, Hotel, Remington Steele, and Ripley's Believe It or Not. Mancini also composed the "Viewer Mail" theme for Late Night with David Letterman. Mancini composed the theme for NBC Nightly News used beginning in 1975, and a different theme by him, titled Salute to the President was used by NBC News for its election coverage (including primaries and conventions) from 1976 to 1992.  Salute to the President was published only in a school-band arrangement, although Mancini performed it frequently with symphony orchestras on his concert tours.

Songs with music by Mancini were staples of the easy listening radio format from the 1960s to the 1980s. To advertisers, Mancini's style symbolized the bright, confident, hospitable voice of bourgeois, inspired by the idealistic Kennedy-era of the 1960s. Some of the artists who have recorded Mancini songs include Andy Williams, Paul Anka, Pat Boone, Anita Bryant, Jack Jones, Frank Sinatra, Perry Como, Connie Francis, Eydie Gorme, Steve Lawrence, Trini Lopez, George Maharis, Johnny Mathis, Jerry Vale, Ray Conniff, Quincy Jones, The Lennon Sisters, The Lettermen, Herb Alpert, Eddie Cano, Frank Chacksfield, Warren Covington, Sarah Vaughan, Shelly Manne, James Moody, Percy Faith, Ferrante & Teicher, Horst Jankowski, Andre Kostelanetz, Peter Nero, Liberace, Mantovani, Tony Bennett, Julie London, Wayne Newton, Arthur Fiedler, Secret Agent and the Boston Pops Orchestra,  Peggy Lee, and Matt Monro. The Anita Kerr Quartet won a Grammy award (1965) for their album We Dig Mancini, a cover of his songs. Lawrence Welk held Mancini in very high regard, and frequently featured Mancini's music on The Lawrence Welk Show (Mancini made at least two guest appearances on the show). Mancini briefly hosted his own musical variety TV show in a similar format to Welk's, The Mancini Generation, which aired in syndication during the 1972–73 season.

Mancini recorded over 90 albums, in styles ranging from big band to light classical to pop. Eight of these albums were certified gold by the Recording Industry Association of America. He had a 20-year contract with RCA Victor, resulting in 60 commercial record albums that made him a household name among artists of easy-listening music. Mancini's earliest recordings in the 1950s and early 1960s were of the jazz idiom; with the success of Peter Gunn, Mr. Lucky, and Breakfast at Tiffany's, Mancini shifted to recording primarily his own music in record albums and film soundtracks. (Relatively little of his music was written for recordings compared to the amount that was written for film and television.) Beginning with his 1969 hit arrangement of Nino Rota's A Time for Us (as his only Billboard Hot 100 top 10 entry, the No. 1 hit "Love Theme from Romeo and Juliet") and its accompanying album A Warm Shade of Ivory, Mancini began to function more as a piano soloist and easy-listening artist recording music primarily written by other people. In this period, for two of his best-selling albums he was joined by trumpet virtuoso and The Tonight Show bandleader Doc Severinsen.

Among Mancini's orchestral scores are (Lifeforce, The Great Mouse Detective, Sunflower, Tom and Jerry: The Movie, Molly Maguires, The Hawaiians), and darker themes (Experiment in Terror, The White Dawn, Wait Until Dark, The Night Visitor).

Mancini was also a concert performer, conducting over fifty engagements per year, resulting in over 600 symphony performances during his lifetime. He conducted nearly all of the leading symphony orchestras of the world, including the London Symphony Orchestra, the Israel Philharmonic, the Boston Pops, the Los Angeles Philharmonic and the Royal Philharmonic Orchestra. One of his favorites was the Minnesota Orchestra, where he debuted the Thorn Birds Suite in June 1983. He appeared in 1966, 1980 and 1984 in command performances for the British Royal Family. He also toured several times with Johnny Mathis and also with Andy Williams, who had both sung many of Mancini's songs; Mathis and Mancini collaborated on the 1986 album The Hollywood Musicals. In 1987 he conducted an impromptu charity concert in London in aid of Children In Need. The concert included Tchaikovsky's 1812 Overture with firework accompaniment over the River Thames.

Cameos
Shortly before his death in 1994, he made a one-off cameo appearance in the first season of the sitcom series Frasier, as a call-in patient to Dr. Frasier Crane's radio show. Mancini voiced the character Al, who speaks with a melancholy drawl and hates the sound of his own voice, in the episode "Guess Who's Coming to Breakfast?" Moments after Mancini's cameo ends, Frasier's radio broadcast plays "Moon River".

Mancini also had an uncredited performance as a pianist in the 1967 movie Gunn, the movie version of the series Peter Gunn, the score of which he had composed.

In the 1966 Pink Panther cartoon Pink, Plunk, Plink, the panther commandeered an orchestra and proceeded to conduct Mancini's theme for the series. At the end, the shot switched to rare live action, and Mancini was seen alone applauding in the audience. Mancini also made a brief appearance in the title sequence of 1993's Son of the Pink Panther, allowing the panther to conduct Bobby McFerrin in performing the film's theme tune.

Death and legacy
Mancini died of pancreatic cancer in Los Angeles on June 14, 1994. He was working at the time on the Broadway stage version of Victor/Victoria, which he never saw on stage. Mancini was survived by his wife of 43 years, singer Virginia "Ginny" O'Connor, with whom he had three children. She died on October 25, 2021, at age 97.

They had met while both were members of the Tex Beneke orchestra, just after World War II. In 1948, Mrs. Mancini was one of the founders of the Society of Singers, a non-profit organization which benefits the health and welfare of professional singers worldwide.

One of Mancini's twin daughters, Monica Mancini, is a professional singer; her sister Felice runs The Mr. Holland's Opus Foundation (MHOF). His son Christopher is a music publisher and promoter in Los Angeles.

Henry Mancini created a scholarship at UCLA and some of his library and works are archived in the music library at UCLA, with additional materials preserved at the Library of Congress.

In 1996, the Henry Mancini Institute, an academy for young music professionals, was founded by Jack Elliott in Mancini's honor, and was later under the direction of composer-conductor Patrick Williams. By the mid-2000s, however, the institute could not sustain itself and closed its doors on December 30, 2006. The American Society of Composers, Authors and Publishers (ASCAP) Foundation "Henry Mancini Music Scholarship" has been awarded annually since 2001.

In 2005, the Henry Mancini Arts Academy was opened as a division of the Lincoln Park Performing Arts Center. The center is located in Midland, Pennsylvania, minutes away from Mancini's hometown of Aliquippa. The Henry Mancini Arts Academy is an evening-and-weekend performing arts program for children from pre-K to grade 12, with some classes also available for adults. The program includes dance, voice, musical theater, and instrumental lessons.

The American Film Institute ranked Mancini's songs "Moon River" No. 4 and "Days of Wine and Roses"  No. 39 on their list of the greatest songs and his score for The Pink Panther No. 20 on their list of the greatest film scores. His scores for Breakfast at Tiffany's (1961), Charade (1963), Hatari! (1962), Touch of Evil (1958) and Wait Until Dark (1967) were also nominated for the list.

Awards
Mancini was nominated for 72 Grammy Awards and won 20. He was nominated for 18 Academy Awards and won four. He also won a Golden Globe Award and was nominated for two Emmy Awards.

In 1961, Mancini won two Academy Awards, one for "Moon River" for Best Original Song and one for Best Scoring of a Dramatic or Comedy Picture for the movie Breakfast at Tiffany's. In 1962, he won Best Original Song again, this time for "Days of Wine and Roses". He won Best Original Score again in 1982 for the movie Victor/Victoria.

In 1989, Mancini received the Golden Plate Award of the American Academy of Achievement.

In 1997, Mancini was posthumously awarded an honorary doctorate of music from Berklee College of Music.

On April 13, 2004, the United States Postal Service honored Mancini with a thirty-seven cent commemorative stamp. The stamp was painted by artist Victor Stabin and shows Mancini conducting in front of a list of some of his movie and TV themes.

Discography

Hit singles

Albums

 The Versatile Henry Mancini (Liberty LST-7121, 1957)
 Sousa in Stereo (Warner Bros. BS-1209, 1958)
 March Step in Hi-Fi (Warner Bros. BS-1312, 1959)
 The Music from Peter Gunn (RCA Victor LSP-1956, 1959)
 More Music from Peter Gunn (RCA Victor LSP-2040, 1959)
 The Mancini Touch (RCA Victor LSP-2101, 1959)
 The Blues and the Beat (RCA Victor LSP-2147, 1960)
 Music from Mr. Lucky, (RCA Victor LSP-2198, 1960)
 Combo! (RCA Victor LSP-2258, 1960)
 Mr. Lucky Goes Latin (RCA Victor LSP-2360, 1961)
 Our Man In Hollywood (RCA Victor LSP-2604, 1963)
 Uniquely Mancini (RCA Victor LSP-2692, 1963)
 The Best of Mancini [compilation] (RCA Victor LSP-2693, 1964)
 Mancini Plays Mancini (RCA Camden CAS-2158)
 Everybody's Favorite (RCA Camden CXS-9034)
 The Concert Sound of Henry Mancini (RCA Victor LSP-2897, 1964)
 Dear Heart (And Other Songs About Love) (RCA Victor LSP-2990, 1965)
 The Latin Sound of Henry Mancini (RCA Victor LSP-3356, 1965)
 The Academy Award Songs (RCA Victor LSP-6013, 1966)
 A Merry Mancini Christmas (RCA Victor LSP-3612, 1966)
 Mancini '67: The Big Band Sound of Henry Mancini (RCA Victor LSP-3694, 1967)
 Music of Hawaii (RCA Victor LSP-3713, 1967)
 Encore! More of the Concert Sound of Henry Mancini (RCA Victor LSP-3887, 1967)
 The Mancini Sound (RCA Victor LSP-3943, 1968)
 The Big Latin Band of Henry Mancini (RCA Victor LSP-4049, 1968)
 Debut! Henry Mancini Conducting the First Recording of the Philadelphia Orchestra Pops (RCA Red Seal LSC-3106, 1969)
 A Warm Shade of Ivory (RCA Victor LSP-4140, 1969)
 Six Hours Past Sunset (RCA Victor LSP-4239, 1969)
 Mancini Country (RCA Victor LSP-4307, 1970)
 Theme from "Z" and Other Film Music (RCA Victor LSP-4350, 1970)
 Mancini Plays the Theme from "Love Story" (RCA Victor LSP-4466, 1970)
 This is Henry Mancini [compilation] (RCA Victor VPS-6029, 1970)
 Mancini Concert (RCA Victor LSP-4542, 1971)
 Brass on Ivory with Doc Severinsen (RCA Victor LSP-4629, 1972)
 Big Screen - Little Screen (RCA Victor LSP-4630, 1972)
 Music from the TV Series "The Mancini Generation" (RCA Victor LSP-4689, 1972)
 Brass, Ivory & Strings with Doc Severinsen (RCA APL1-0098, 1973)
 Country Gentleman (RCA APL1-0270, 1974)
 Hangin' Out (RCA CPL1-0672, 1974)
 Pure Gold [compilation] (RCA ANL1-0980, 1975)
 Symphonic Soul (RCA APL1-1025, 1975)
 The Cop Show Themes (RCA Victor APL1-1896, 1976)
 Mancini's Angels (RCA CPL1-2290, 1977)
 The Theme Scene (RCA APL1-3052, 1978)
 In The Pink with James Galway (RCA Red Seal RCD1-5315, 1984)
 The Hollywood Musicals with Johnny Mathis (Columbia CK-40372, 1986)
 As Time Goes By and Other Classic Movie Love Songs (RCA Victor 09026-60974-2, 1992)

Ballets 

 Coffee House (1959), written for the Gene Kelly Show

Soundtracks

Note: Most of Mancini's scores were not released on LP soundtrack albums. His TV movie music albums were not soundtrack albums but are titled "Music from ..." or "Music from the Motion Picture ..." He routinely retained the rights to his music. Mancini's contracts allowed him to release his own albums for which he rearranged the score music into arrangements more appropriate for listening outside of the context of the film/theater.  Actual film scores using players from Hollywood unions recording under major motion picture studio contracts were expensive to release on LP (ex: the soundtrack for Our Man Flint (not a Mancini score) cost $1 more than other LP albums of the day).  Many soundtrack albums used to claim "Original Soundtrack" or words to that effect, but were not necessarily the actual soundtrack recordings. These albums were usually recorded with a smaller orchestra than that used for the actual scoring (ex: Dimitri Tiomkin's score to The Alamo). However, many Hollywood musicians were featured on Mancini's albums recorded in RCA's Hollywood recording studios and faux "Original Soundtrack" albums. Eventually some of his scores and faux "Original Soundtrack" scores by numerous composers were released in limited edition CDs.

Arabesque, RCA Victor LSP-3623
Bachelor in Paradise, Film Score Monthly FSMCD vol. 7 nr. 18
Breakfast at Tiffany's: Music from the Motion Picture, RCA Victor LSP-2362
Charade, RCA Victor LSP-2755
Darling Lili, RCA LSPX-1000
Experiment in Terror, RCA Victor LSP-2442
Frenzy (along with the Ron Goodwin score), Quartet Records QR505
Gaily, Gaily, United Artists UAS-5202
The Glass Menagerie, MCA MCAD-6222
The Great Mouse Detective, Varèse Sarabande/MCA VSD-5359
The Great Race, RCA Victor LSP-3402
The Great Waldo Pepper, MCA MCA-2085
Gunn ...Number One!, RCA Victor LSP-3840
Harry & Son, Quartet Records QRSCE-023 
Hatari!, RCA Victor LSP-2559
The Hawaiians, United Artists UAS-5210
High Time, RCA Victor LSP-2314
Lifeforce, Varèse Sarabande STV-81249
Me, Natalie, Columbia OS-03350
The Molly Maguires, Paramount PAS-6000
Mommie Dearest, Real Gone Music RGM-0640
Mr. Hobbs Takes a Vacation, Intrada special collection vol. 11
Nightwing, Varèse Sarabande VCL-0309-1091
Oklahoma Crude, RCA Victor APL1-0271
The Party, RCA Victor LSP-3997
The Pink Panther, RCA Victor LSP-2795
The Pink Panther Strikes Again, United Artists UA-LA694
The Return of the Pink Panther, RCA Victor ABL1-0968
Revenge of the Pink Panther, United Artists UA-LA913-H
Santa Claus: The Movie, EMI America SJ-17177
Silver Streak, Intrada special collection vol. 5
Sometimes a Great Notion, Decca DL-79185
Son of the Pink Panther, Milan/BMG 74321-16461-2
Sunflower, Avco Embassy AVE-0-11001
Sunset, Quartet Records QRSCE-045 
The Thief Who Came to Dinner, Warner Bros. BS-2700
The Thorn Birds, Varèse Sarabande/Universal 302 066 564-2
Tom and Jerry – The Movie, MCA MCAD-10721
Touch of Evil, Challenge CHL-602
Two for the Road, RCA Victor LSP-3802
Victor Victoria, GNP Crescendo GNPD-8038
Visions of Eight, RCA Victor ABL1-0231
W.C. Fields and Me, MCA MCA-2092
What Did You Do in the War, Daddy?, RCA Victor LSP-3648
Who Is Killing the Great Chefs of Europe?, Epic SE-35692
Without a Clue, BSX BSXCD-8832

Filmography

The Raiders (1952)
The Glenn Miller Story (1953)
Abbott and Costello Go to Mars (1953)
Law and Order (1953)
City Beneath the Sea (1953)
Destry (1954)
Creature from the Black Lagoon (1954)
The Private War of Major Benson (1955)
The Benny Goodman Story (1956)
The Creature Walks Among Us (1956)
Rock, Pretty Baby (1956)
Summer Love (1957)
Damn Citizen (1958)
Touch of Evil (1958)
The Big Beat (1958)
Operation Petticoat (1959)
High Time (1960)
The Great Impostor (1960)
Breakfast at Tiffany's (1961)
Bachelor in Paradise (1961)
Experiment in Terror (1962)
Mr. Hobbs Takes a Vacation (1962)
Hatari! (1962)
Days of Wine and Roses (1962)
Soldier in the Rain (1963)
Charade (1963)
The Pink Panther (1963)
Man's Favorite Sport? (1964)
A Shot in the Dark (1964)
Dear Heart (1964)
The Great Race (1965)
Moment to Moment (1966)
Arabesque (1966)
What Did You Do in the War, Daddy? (1966)
Two for the Road (1967)
Gunn ...Number One! (1967)
Wait Until Dark (1967)
The Party (1968)
Me, Natalie (1969)
Gaily, Gaily (1969)
The Molly Maguires (1970)
Sunflower (1970)
The Hawaiians (1970)
Darling Lili (1970)
The Night Visitor (1971)
Sometimes a Great Notion (1971)
Frenzy (Rejected Score) (1972)
The Thief Who Came To Dinner (1973)
Visions of Eight (1973)
Oklahoma Crude (1973)
That's Entertainment! (1974)
The White Dawn (1974)
The Girl from Petrovka (1974)
99 and 44/100% Dead (1974)
The Great Waldo Pepper (1975)
The Return of the Pink Panther (1975)
Jacqueline Susann's Once Is Not Enough (1975)
W.C. Fields and Me (1976)
Silver Streak (1976)
The Pink Panther Strikes Again (1976)
Angela (1977)
House Calls (1978)
Revenge of the Pink Panther (1978)
Who Is Killing the Great Chefs of Europe? (1978)
The Prisoner of Zenda (1979)
Nightwing (1979)
10 (1979)
Little Miss Marker (1980)
A Change of Seasons (1980)
Back Roads (1981)
S.O.B. (1981)
Condorman (1981)
Mommie Dearest (1981)
Victor Victoria (1982)
Trail of the Pink Panther (1982)
Better Late Than Never (1983)
Second Thoughts (1983)
Curse of the Pink Panther (1983)
The Man Who Loved Women (1983)
Harry & Son (1984)
That's Dancing (1985)
Lifeforce (1985)
Santa Claus: The Movie (1985)
The Great Mouse Detective (1986)
A Fine Mess (1986)
That's Life! (1986)
Blind Date (1987)
The Glass Menagerie (1987)
Sunset (1988)
Without a Clue (1988)
Physical Evidence (1989)
Welcome Home (1989)
Ghost Dad (1990)
Fear (1990)
Switch (1991)
Married to It (1991)
Tom and Jerry: The Movie (1992)
Son of the Pink Panther (1993)

TV Themes

Peter Gunn (1958)
Mr. Lucky (1959)
Man of the World (1962)
The Richard Boone Show (1963)
Blaulicht (1968)
The Pink Panther Show (1969)
Cade's County (1971)
The NBC Mystery Movie (1971)
The Blue Knight (1975)
What's Happening!! (1976)
Kingston: Confidential (1977)
Sanford Arms (1977)
The All-New Pink Panther Show (1978)
NBC Nightly News (1978)
Newhart (1982, one of the few shows to credit Mancini in the opening credits)
Remington Steele (1982)
Ripley's Believe It or Not! (1982)Hotel (1983)Pink Panther and Sons (1984)What's Happening Now!! (1985)Tic Tac Dough (1990)Julie (1992)Pink Panther and Pals (2010)

Bibliography
 Mancini, Henry. Sounds and Scores: A Practical Guide to Professional Orchestration (1962)
 

References

Sources
 
 Henry Mancini: Sounds and Scores, Northridge Music, Inc. 1973, 1986
 Liner notes to RCA Victor LPM/LSP-1956
 Liner notes to RCA Victor LPM/LSP-3840

Further reading
 Brown, Royal S. Overtones and Undertones: Reading Film Music (1994)
 Büdinger, Matthias. "An Interview with Henry Mancini" (Soundtrack, vol. 7, No. 26, 1988)
 Büdinger, Matthias. "Feeling Fancy Free" (Film Score Monthly, vol. 10, No. 2)
 Büdinger, Matthias. "Henry Mancini 1924–1994" (Film Score Monthly, No. 46/47, p. 5
 Büdinger, Matthias. "Henry Mancini Remembered' (Soundtrack, vol. 13, No. 51)
 Büdinger, Matthias. "Henry Mancini" (Soundtrack, vol. 13, No. 50, 1994)
 Büdinger, Matthias. "Whistling Away the Dark" (Film Score Monthly, No. 45, p. 7
 Larson, Randall. "Henry Mancini: On Scoring 'Lifeforce' and 'Santa Claus'" (interview) (CinemaScore, No. 15, 1987)
 Thomas, Tony. Music for the Movies (1973)
 Thomas, Tony. Film Score'' (1979)

External links

 

 
1924 births
1994 deaths
20th-century American composers
20th-century American conductors (music)
20th-century American male musicians
20th-century American pianists
20th-century jazz composers
American film score composers
American flautists
American jazz composers
American male conductors (music)
American male film score composers
American male jazz composers
American male jazz musicians
American music arrangers
American musical theatre composers
American people of Italian descent
American television composers
Animated film score composers
Best Original Music Score Academy Award winners
Best Original Song Academy Award-winning songwriters
Big band bandleaders
Big band pianists
Broadway composers and lyricists
Carnegie Mellon University College of Fine Arts alumni
Deaths from cancer in California
Deaths from pancreatic cancer
Easy listening musicians
Fresh Sounds Records artists
Golden Globe Award-winning musicians
Grammy Lifetime Achievement Award winners
Jazz musicians from Ohio
Jazz musicians from Pennsylvania
Juilliard School alumni
Liberty Records artists
Light music composers
Male musical theatre composers
Male television composers
Military personnel from Cleveland
Musicians from Cleveland
People from Beaver County, Pennsylvania
RCA Victor artists
Songwriters from Ohio
Songwriters from Pennsylvania
Swing pianists
United States Army personnel of World War II
United States Army soldiers
20th-century flautists